Graphic Story Magazine was an American magazine edited and published by Bill Spicer in the late 1960s and early 1970s. Attempting to find a new direction for narrative art and a point of departure from commercial comic book stories, this journal of criticism and artwork evolved from Spicer's previous magazine, Fantasy Illustrated.

Gary Groth, editor-publisher of The Comics Journal and Fantagraphics Books, wrote in 2009,

Publication history 
There were nine issues of Graphic Story Magazine (with the issue numbering continuing from Fantasy Illustrated), with pages per issue varying from 32 pages to the 64-page issue #14 (Winter 1971–72).  As writer and historian Steven Grant describes the magazine's roots:

Issues #12 and #14 were devoted entirely to the work of Basil Wolverton. Interviews included Alex Toth (#10). Will Gould (#11), John Severin (#13), Gahan Wilson (#15), and Howard Nostrand (#16).

The run ended with issue #16 (Summer 1974).

Artists and writers

Iissue #14 (Winter 1971–72) featured Basil Wolverton's Powerhouse Pepper, Shock Shannon, The Story of Man, The Counter Culture, Common Types of Barflize and Wolverton caricatures, plus an interview with Wolverton.

The final issue, #16 (Summer 1974), included "The Wishing World" by Mark Evanier and John Pound, "Routine" by George Metzger, a story by Bob Powell (Colorama) and Bhob Stewart's interview with artist Howard Nostrand (later reprinted in The Comics Journal). The front cover by Nostrand showed a decaying, skeletal comic book artist returning from the grave to deliver a completed story to a comic book publisher.

Spin-offs
The newsletter Graphic Story World became Wonderworld. Spicer later teamed with Evanier to edit and publish Fanfare, covering popular culture in general.

See also
Comic Art
Graphic storytelling
Hogan's Alley
Nemo, the Classic Comics Library
witzend
Xero

References

External links
Shelley, Bill. Sense of Wonder

Defunct literary magazines published in the United States
Annual magazines published in the United States
Magazines about comics
Magazines established in 1967
Magazines disestablished in 1974
Magazines published in California